V604 Aquilae or Nova Aquilae 1905 is a nova which was first observed in the constellation Aquila in 1905 with a maximum brightness of magnitude 7.6. It was never bright enough to be seen with the naked eye. It was discovered by Williamina Fleming on a Harvard College Observatory photographic plate taken on August 31, 1905. Examination of plates taken earlier indicates that peak brightness occurred in mid-August 1905. The star's quiescent visual band brightness is 19.6.

V604 Aquilae faded by 3 magnitudes in just 25 days, making it a "fast nova".  Detection of a faint nebula surrounding the star, with a radius of 0.4 arc minutes, was reported early in 1906. In 1994, a photometric study detected brightness variations of up to ~0.45 magnitudes on timescales of about one hour.  An attempt to detect cool molecular gas surrounding the nova in 2015 was unsuccessful.

References

External links
 http://www.tsm.toyama.toyama.jp/
 Image V604 Aquilae
 GCVS V0604 Aql

176779
Novae
Aquila (constellation)
1905 in science
Aquilae, V604